Ann-Charlotte Alverfors (23 January 1947 – 20 March 2018) was a Swedish writer. She was best known for her autobiographical trilogy, which became the basis for a six-episode miniseries, titled Sparvöga (lit. Sparrow-eye), in 1989.

The daughter of Tor Alverfors and Margaret Andersson, she was born in Eksjö and was educated at a folk high school. In 1972, she published a collection of poetry Paternosterhissar; she published a second collection, Jönköping 6 in 1975. Alverfos authored a trilogy of autobiographical novels: Sparvöga (1975), Hjärteblodet (1976) and Snabelros (1977); the novels formed the basis for a television series. She lived in Uppsala.

Alverfos was married to professor Arnulf Merker, who died in 2010.

Selected works 
  Aldrig, novel (1993), received the Swedish Trade Union Confederation cultural prize and the Martin Koch Prize
 Barn av samma ögonblick, novel (2000)
 Vem ska trösta Gösta?, illustrated novel (2007)

References

Further reading

External links 

1947 births
2018 deaths
Swedish women poets
Swedish women novelists
People from Eksjö Municipality